The Winter of Discontent refers to the winter of 1978–79 in the United Kingdom, during which there were widespread strikes.

Winter of (Our) Discontent may also refer to:
 Winter of Discontent (US history), a term for the period in United States history from 1950 to 1952, roughly coinciding with the Korean War

In arts and entertainment:
 Now is the Winter of our Discontent, a famous line in Shakespeare's play Richard III
 Winter of Discontent (novel), a 1941 novel by Gilber Frankau
 The Winter of Our Discontent, John Steinbeck's last novel, published in 1961
 The Winter of Our Discontent (film), a 1983 television film, based on Steinbeck's novel
 Winter of Discontent (film), a 2012 Egyptian drama directed by Ibrahim El Batout
 The Winter of Our Discontent (album), 2003, by The Echoing Green
 The Winter of Discontent (The Generators), 2006 album

See also
 Now Is the Winter of Our Discothèque, 2005 album by Princess Superstar
"The Winter of Our Monetized Content", 2019 episode of The Simpsons